 

Louisiana ex rel. Francis v. Resweber, 329 U.S. 459 (1947), is a case in which the U.S. Supreme Court was asked whether imposing capital punishment (the electric chair) a second time, after it failed in an attempt to execute Willie Francis in 1946, constituted a violation of the United States Constitution. The issues raised surrounded the double jeopardy clause of the 5th Amendment, and the cruel and unusual punishment clause of the 8th Amendment, as made applicable to the State of Louisiana via the due process clause of the 14th Amendment.

In an opinion by Justice Stanley Forman Reed, which three other justices (Chief Justice Vinson and Associate Justices Hugo Black and Robert H. Jackson) joined, and with which Justice Felix Frankfurter concurred, the Court held that re-executing Francis did not constitute double jeopardy or cruel and unusual punishment.  Justice Reed wrote,
Our minds rebel against permitting the same sovereignty to punish an accused twice for the same offense. But where the accused successfully seeks review of a conviction, there is no double jeopardy upon a new trial. Even where a state obtains a new trial after conviction because of errors, while an accused may be placed on trial a second time, it is not the sort of hardship to the accused that is forbidden by the Fourteenth Amendment ... For we see no difference from a constitutional point of view between a new trial for error of law at the instance of the state that results in a death sentence instead of imprisonment for life and an execution that follows a failure of equipment. When an accident, with no suggestion of malevolence, prevents the consummation of a sentence, the state's subsequent course in the administration of its criminal law is not affected on that account by any requirement of due process under the Fourteenth Amendment. We find no double jeopardy here which can be said to amount to a denial of federal due process in the proposed execution. (Citations omitted).

Dissenting, however, Justice Harold Burton (joined by Justices William O. Douglas, Frank Murphy, and Wiley Rutledge) argued, 
How many deliberate and intentional reapplications of electric current does it take to produce a cruel, unusual and unconstitutional punishment? While five applications would be more cruel and unusual than one, the uniqueness of the present case demonstrates that, today, two separated applications are sufficiently 'cruel and unusual' to be prohibited. If five attempts would be 'cruel and unusual,' it would be difficult to draw the line between two, three, four and five. It is not difficult, however, as we here contend, to draw the line between the one continuous application prescribed by statute and any other application of the current. Lack of intent that the first application be less than fatal is not material. The intent of the executioner cannot lessen the torture or excuse the result.

Francis was successfully executed the following year.

See also
 List of United States Supreme Court cases, volume 329

References

Further reading
 Gilbert King, The Execution of Willie Francis: Race, Murder, and the Search for Justice in the American South, Basic Civitas, New York, 2008.
 Daven Hiskey, The Teenager who was Executed Twice, http://www.todayifoundout.com/index.php/2012/09/the-teenager-who-was-executed-twice/ (Retrieved February 12, 2017)

External links
 

United States Supreme Court cases
Capital punishment in Louisiana
1947 in United States case law
United States Double Jeopardy Clause case law
Cruel and Unusual Punishment Clause and death penalty case law
United States Supreme Court cases of the Vinson Court